Longistrongylus is a genus of nematodes belonging to the family Trichostrongylidae.

Species:
 Longistrongylus muraschkinzevi (Shulz & Kadenatsii, 1950)

References

Nematodes